Hone Pihama Te Rei Hanataua (?–1890) was a notable New Zealand tribal leader, assessor, coach proprietor, hotel proprietor and land developer. Of Māori descent, he identified with the Ngati Ruanui iwi.

References

1890 deaths
New Zealand hoteliers
New Zealand Māori public servants
Ngāti Ruanui people
Year of birth missing